The Alexander Mosaic, also known as the Battle of Issus Mosaic, is a Roman floor mosaic originally from the House of the Faun in Pompeii (an alleged imitation of a Philoxenus of Eretria or Apelles' painting, 4th century BC) that dates from . It is typically dated in the second half of the century between 120 and 100 B.C. It depicts a battle between the armies of Alexander the Great and Darius III of Persia and measures . This work of art is a combination of different artistic traditions such as Italic, Hellenistic, and Roman. The mosaic is considered "Roman" based on the broader context of its time and location in relation to the later Roman Republic. The original is preserved in the Naples National Archaeological Museum. The mosaic is believed to be a copy of an early 3rd-century BC Hellenistic painting.

Subject

Battle
Alexander of Macedonia fought Darius III, the commander-in-chief of the Persian army, as he moved west across the Mediterranean.

The mosaic illustrates a battle in which Alexander charges the Persian king Darius. On the left side of the picture, Alexander of Macedonia is seen with his helmet fell off his head and a worried expression on his face.He stabs the soldier in front of him on the horse with his spear and kill him. The painting's protagonist, Darius III, is reaching out to the soldier that is devoting his life to save him while the other soldier trying to get the king's chariot out of the battle scene.The battle scene comprises over 50 men.

It depicts a battle between Darius III of Persia's armies and Alexander's, and it has dimensions of 2.72 meters by 5.13 meters. This mosaic, which dates back to the late 2nd or early 1st century B.C. and is typical of Pompeian pavements, is created out of tesserae rather than opus signinum or other forms of stone chips put in mortar. This picture stands out among ancient works of art because it depicts a large group of soldiers, depicts each figure with meticulous attention to detail, expertly captures the expressions that appear on the warriors' faces, and uses muted colors. Alexander defeated him at the Battle of Issus and again two years later at the Battle of Gaugamela. The work is traditionally believed to show the Battle of Issus.

At this precise moment, Darius is making the order because the Persian spears are still pointed in the direction of the Greeks, and the king is riding in a chariot being wheeled around.  In the third century B.C., an anonymous artist produced the Alexander Mosaic. Despite its location in the fabled "Casa del Fauno," this holds. Philoxenos of Eretrea, who lived in the 4th century B.C., is a possible author of the original version of the poem.

Alexander and Darius

The mosaic features many figures in a very large space. The two most distinguished and recognizable figures are Alexander the Great and King Darius III of Persia. Alexander is depicted in a profile view facing the left side of the mosaic. He is posed in action with his lance in his right arm being warded off by the hand of an enemy cavalryman gripping it on the shaft below its sharp head as his mount tumbles to the ground. Alexander features a Roman nose and a stoic look in combat. Alexander wears a breastplate with the head of Medusa, a famous Gorgon. This can be seen as a reference to the gorgon's magical head. The head of Medusa's power to turn people to stone was used as a protection in Greek mythology. One other interpretation of the head of the Medusa is its use as a reference to divine birth. Both of these theories contribute to the power presented in the mosaic of Alexander the Great.

Alexander rides his horse Bucephalus. He is shown with a lot of curly soft-textured hair. His hair is typical of Greek royal portraiture that was established in the 4th century BC. Alexander's gaze is trained on the Persian King Darius. Note that Alexander does not wear a battle helmet in the mosaic so that he could be recognized as the great conqueror. After Alexander the Great was declared king of Asia around 330 BC,  he adopted a new royal court style. His costume was rethought and redesigned with a new royal insignia and an emphasis on decadence. Scholars believe Alexander had a specific notion of what it was to be a king in Asia and to be the Great King, therefore he required his dress to be magnificent to command his new conquered people.  Alexander intended to replace Darius as king of Persia with a highly expanded autocracy  while commanding respect and authority.

Darius can be recognized as the other large figure in the mosaic. Darius and his charioteer takes up a large portion of the mosaic in the right half of the depiction. There are various precarious elements surrounding him. In the background Darius' charioteer whips the horses to flee from the battle scene. There is visible fear and anxiety in the Persian king's face, seen especially in his furrowed brows and deep frown. Darius is positioned holding a bow in his left hand while his right arm is outstretched towards Alexander. Directly in front of the king's chariot is a soldier holding the reins to his horse. The horse is a large figure that draws much attention because of its backward facing positioning. The horse's hindquarters are facing the audience with a raised tail. This may be seen as a reference to the Persian defeat and weak leadership displayed. Or, more simply, a reference to Darius being "a horse's ass," a turn of phrase that may have been around since ancient days.

Other features
Darius' brother Oxyathres is also portrayed, sacrificing himself to save the King.
Radical foreshortening – as in the central horse, seen from behind – and the use of shading to convey a sense of mass and volume enhance the naturalistic effect of the scene. Repeated diagonal spears, clashing metal, and the crowding of men and horses evoke the din of battle. At the same time, action is arrested by dramatic details such as the fallen horse and the Persian soldier in the foreground who watches his own death throes reflected in a shield.

History of the mosaic

Production
The mosaic is made of about one and a half million tiny colored tiles called tesserae, arranged in gradual curves called opus vermiculatum, (also known as "worm work," because they seem to replicate the slow motion of a crawling worm). These tesserae were about 0.08 inches wide, and it is estimated that over four million pieces were used in the mosaic. The color scale of Roman mosaics are extremely rich in gradation. The process of gathering materials for mosaics was a complex undertaking since the color scale was based solely on the pieces of marble that could be found in nature. Following the style of many other Hellenistic artists, the entire mosaic is composed of reds, yellows, black, and white. The mosaic is an unusually detailed work for a private residence and was likely commissioned by a wealthy person or family. There is evidence that the mosaic was imported from the East, as there are places where some details are distorted and changed. Some scholars argue that this is evidence that the mosaic was created in pieces and reassembled in Pompeii. The fact that this scene was made to be viewed in the house of a Roman civilian reveals that Alexander the Great was more than just a heroic image to the Romans. Because Roman leaders followed after Alexander's image, Roman civilians also aspired to emulate the power he represented. Since the mosaic was arranged on the floor where the patron could receive guests, it was the first decorative object a visitor would see upon entering that room. Modern research indicates that there may have been multiple columns removed from the colonnade to improve lighting and viewing of the mosaic.

Similar to Greek paintings, the mosaic of Alexander the Great lacks rich iconography towards the top, which, on a vertical surface, would have been considerably higher above the viewer's line of sight and garnered less creative attention. This is one way in which the two forms of art are comparable to one another. As a bonus, the mosaic displays the realism and naturalism typical of Greek portrayals of humans, especially regarding facial expression, emotional tone, and anatomical structure.

Originality 
The Alexander Mosaic is believed to be a copy of a Hellenistic Greek painting made during the 4th century BC.  The style of the mosaic is distinctly Greek in that it depicts close up portraits of the main heroes of the battle. Typically within Greek battle scenes the heroes are difficult to define within the commotion. The mosaic contains very specific details that scholars believe would have been lost if the mosaic was created any later than a couple hundred years after the battle. It is a commonly accepted belief concerning the Alexander mosaic that one must use the Greek original to interpret the meaning of the Roman copy. The debate among scholars over the significance of the Roman copy is that it cannot and should not be interpreted in the same cultural and historical context as the Greek original. Some believe that in doing so, it takes away both context and achievement from Roman artists. The mosaic is held to be a copy either of a painting by Aristides of Thebes, or of a lost late 4th-century BC fresco by the painter Philoxenus of Eretria. The latter is mentioned by Pliny the Elder (XXXV, 110) as a commission for the Macedonian king Cassander.

Contextualizing both Greek and Roman versions 
There is limited evidence in existence today to contextualize many, if not most, rediscovered Roman artworks. The Alexander Mosaic depicts a rich subject narrative of two historical figures engaged in a defining battle. This imagery was most likely placed in the House of the Faun to incorporate and evoke the power of Alexander the Great into Roman canonical depictions. This mosaic is fully capable of communicating a broader message due to its find date and location site, conveying a rich Greek and Roman historical context and background, particularly through its commemoration of a decisive Greek victory over the Persians.

Since the mosaic associates the figures of Alexander and Darius with untraditional symbols, Alexander with the gorgon and Darius with the cross, some scholars have argued that it depicts the Persians in a sympathetic manner.

Modern history
The Alexander Mosaic was preserved due to the volcanic ash that collected over the mosaic during the eruption of Mount Vesuvius in the city of Pompeii in 79 AD. This Roman artwork was found inlaid into the ground of the House of the Faun in between two open peristyles. The mosaic was used to decorate the exedra which is an open room or area that contains seating that is used for conversing. The House of the Faun was a large estate comprising one whole block in Pompeii; this is an area of about 3,000 square meters.

As a significant artwork and piece of history, the scene of the Mosaic remained in the social and cultural sphere. The mosaic was rediscovered in 1831 in Pompeii, Italy, and was later transported to Naples in September 1843. The Alexander Mosaic is now displayed on a wall and preserved in Naples. Until recently it has been on display at the Museo Archeologico Nazionale, although currently its site is covered with a facsimile banner and it appears to have been removed for restoration or display elsewhere. In 1956, the Alexander Mosaic was featured on the ₯1,000 banknote.

Modern copy
In 2003, the International Center for the Study and Teaching of Mosaic (CISIM) in Ravenna, Italy, proposed creating a copy of the mosaic. After CISIM received approval for the project, the mosaic master Severo Bignami and his eight-person team took a large photograph of the mosaic, made a tracing of the image with a dark marker and created a negative impression of it.

The team composed the mosaic in sections in 44 clay frames, trying to preserve the pieces of the mosaic in the exact positions they are in the original mosaic. They had to keep the plates wet at all times. Then they pressed a tissue on the clay to create an image of the outlines of the mosaic in the clay. The team recreated the mosaic with about 2 million pieces of various marble types. When they had placed all the pieces, they covered the result with a layer of glue and gauze and pulled it out of the clay. They placed each section on synthetic concrete and then united the sections with the compound of glass, wool and plastic.

The project took 22 months and cost the equivalent of $216,000. The copy was installed in the House of the Faun in 2005.

Conservation 
In 2015, IPERION CH, the Integrated Platform for the European Research Infrastructure ON Cultural Heritage, researched the mosaic and used various non-invasive analysis techniques to discover the physical composition of the mosaic, in addition to learning which parts were original and which were added after rediscovery. In 2018, a photogrammetric model was created of the mosaic, revealing flaws and cracks invisible to the human eye.

In January 2021 the National Archaeological Museum of Naples began a major restoration project to attempt to conserve the mosaic. In the initial assessment of the mosaic, multiple issues were discovered, including detached tesserae, cracks, bulges and surface depressions. Some areas had been already treated, such as multiple cracks that had been covered by thin paper bandages in a “velinatura” technique, in prior restoration efforts.

The Alexander Mosaic in the History of the House 
The House of the Faun at Pompeii was immediately recognized by its size and decoration as one of the town’s most important houses.  Adolf Hoffmann argues that the House of the Faun was constructed in two principal phases.

The first phase was distinctive from the second that Hoffmann refers to it as the "first House of the Faun" and has recently attempted a reconstruction. In the first half-or at latest by the middle of the second century B.C., the two atria (from image: 27 and 7) and the first peristyle (from image: 36, originally in the Doric order) were constructed. Another distinctive feature of this first phase was the absence, from the north side of the first peristyle, of the Alexander Mosaic and its exedra (37). A large room, underlying the later rooms to the east of the Alexander exedra (from image: 42, 38, and 43), served the first peristyle as its principal exedra during this first phase. Overall, the first incarnation of the House of the Faun dated back to ca. 180 B.C.E., occupied two-thirds of the insula and consisted of two atria, one small house and one peristyle.

According to Hoffmann, the Alexander exedra was not originally part of the layout of the first peristyle. Hoffmann has observed that the first peristyle, originally built in the Doric order, belongs to the earliest phase of the house. The layout of the first peristyle is the key to the house's design, in both practice and theory. The first peristyle dominates the house not only visually and functionally, but it also commands the design, determining the locations and the dimensions of the other major parts. The room is so strategically placed that it would not be an exaggeration to say that the rest of the house had been designed and built around the site with the great treasure of mosaic art set in its floor.

Next, Hoffmann argues, the second phase of the house-the second House of the Faun-commenced through an extensive rebuilding and renovating of the first house. The first peristyle (36) was "refashioned in the Ionic order and was reconstructed into a new peristyle. The Alexander exedra (37) was constructed, facing south, onto the first peristyle. A major renovation phase beginning ca. 110 B.C.E. and ending ca. 75 B.C.E., comprised a new decoration in the so-called First Style (including all the well-known mosaic pavements), as well as the insertion of a second entrance into the tetrastyle atrium, a switch from Doric to Ionic in the portico of the small peristyle, and the construction of the large north peristyle.

In addition to the Alexander Mosaic, several other floor mosaics representing Nilotic events and theatrical masks surround the Alexander Mosaic. This piece of art draws from various artistic periods and movements, including Roman, Hellenistic, and Italic. The name of this mosaic comes from the fact that it was found in a period of the Roman Empire known as the "late Roman Republic."

Eight pictorial mosaics were laid in the House of the Faun as part of a major renovation program of the early 1st c. BCE  Many of them have iconography linking them to Ptolemaic Egypt like a mosaic triptych depicting Egyptian animals in a Nilotic landscape, fish emblema, a emblema depicting a cat attacking a bird that represents statues with the same theme from Ptolemaic Egypt and emblemas of other animals with Ptolemaic Egypt themes. It has traditionally been held that these compositions were laid at different times, the Alexander Mosaic in ca. 110 BCE and the Nilotic triptych in ca. 80 BCE. This view rests on the observation that the bases of the threshold columns were cut back to accommodate the panels of the triptych, and on a perception that the triptych is technically less accomplished than the Alexander Mosaic.

Gallery

References

External links
 Reconstructed and completed Alexander mosaic.

1831 archaeological discoveries
Mosaics
Ancient art on Alexander the Great
Hellenistic art
Collections of the National Archaeological Museum, Naples
War art
Ancient Greek military art
Archaeological discoveries in Italy
Roman mosaics
Cultural depictions of Medusa
Darius III